This is a summary of the electoral history of Mahmoud Ahmadinejad, an Iranian Principlist politician who was President of Iran (2005-2013) and Mayor of Tehran (2003–2005).

City Council election 
In 1998, Mahmoud Ahmadinejad registered for City Council of Tehran election. He failed to win a seat.

Parliament election

2000 

In 2000, Ahmadinejad registered for Iranian Parliament election from Tehran. He was supperted by Islamic Coalition Party, Combatant Clergy Association and was listed in Coalition of Followers of the Line of the Imam and Leader electoral list. Ahmadinejad lost the election. He received 280,046 out of 2,931,113 votes and was ranked 68th.

Mayoral of Tehran 

On 3 May 2003, City Council of Tehran elected him as Mayor by a vote of 12 to 1, with 2 abstentions.

Presidential elections

2005 

In the first round, Ahmadinejad finished second with 5,711,696 votes (19.43%).  In the second round, Ahmadinejad won with 17,284,782 votes (61.69%).

2009 

Ahmadinejad won with 24,527,516 votes (62.63%).

References 

Mahmoud Ahmadinejad
Electoral history of Iranian politicians